The 2020 Virginia Is For Racing Lovers 250 was a NASCAR Xfinity Series race held on September 12, 2020. It was contested over 250 laps on the  tri-oval. It was the twenty-fifth race of the 2020 NASCAR Xfinity Series season. JR Motorsports driver Justin Allgaier collected his third win of the season.

Report

Background 
Richmond Raceway is a 3/4-mile (1.2 km), D-shaped, asphalt race track located just outside Richmond, Virginia in Henrico County. It hosts the NASCAR Cup Series and Xfinity Series. Known as "America's premier short track", it formerly hosted an IndyCar Series race and two USAC sprint car races.

Entry list 

 (R) denotes rookie driver.
 (i) denotes driver who is ineligible for series driver points.

Qualifying 
Tommy Joe Martins was awarded the pole based on the top 20 finishers from the previous day's race.

Qualifying results

Race

Race results

Stage results 
Stage one
Laps: 75

Stage two
Laps: 75

Final stage results 

Laps: 100

Race statistics 
 Lead changes: 9 among 6 different drivers
 Cautions/Laps: 5 for 29
 Time of race: 2 hours, 1 minutes, and 46 seconds
 Average speed:

References 

NASCAR races at Richmond Raceway
2020 in sports in Virginia
Virginia Is For Racing Lovers 250
2020 NASCAR Xfinity Series